Servius is the name of:

 Servius (praenomen), a personal name
 Servius (grammarian), the late fourth-century and early fifth-century grammarian
 Servius Tullius, the Roman king
 Servius Sulpicius Rufus, the 1st century BC Roman jurist

See also
Servius Sulpicius Galba (disambiguation)